The  or  are a group of three Japanese-governed islands in Micronesia. They lie south of the Ogasawara Islands and belong to the municipality of Ogasawara, Tokyo, Tokyo Metropolis, Japan. The islands are all active volcanoes lying atop an island arc that stretches south to the Marianas.

Geography 
The Volcano Islands are:
 , 
Farther north but in the same volcanic arc is:

There is a Japan Self-Defense Forces air base on Iwo Jima with a staff of 380. It is located in the village of Minami. Other than that, the islands are uninhabited.

Fukutoku-Okanoba Generally submerged volcano eruptions sometimes bring it above the surface.

History 
The first recorded sighting by Europeans was in October 1543 by Spanish navigator Bernardo de la Torre on board of carrack San Juan de Letrán when trying to return from Sarangani to New Spain. Iwo Jima was charted as Sufre, the old Spanish term for sulphur.

The islands were uninhabited in 1889 when the two northern islands were settled by Japanese settlers from the Izu Islands. They were annexed by Japan in 1891.  However, archeological evidence has revealed that islands of the greater Bonin archipelago were prehistorically inhabited by an unknown Micronesian people.

The population was about 1,100 in 1939, distributed among five settlements: Higashi, Minami, Nishi, Kita and Motoyama (meaning "East", "South", "West", "North" and "Mountain of Origin", or central mountain) on Iwo Jima; and two settlements on Kita Iwo Jima: Ishino-mura ("Ishino village"; Ishino is a surname) and Nishi-mura ("West village"). The municipal administration office was located in Higashi until 1940 when the municipality was integrated into the administration of Ogasawara, Tokyo.

Iwo Jima was the site of the Battle of Iwo Jima in World War II, and the island group came under the United States administration. The Volcano Islands were returned to Japanese rule in 1968.

Ecology

The Volcano Islands have a subtropical climate. They are part of the Ogasawara subtropical moist forests ecoregion and are home to unique and diverse plants and animals, including many endemic species. They have been recognised as forming an Important Bird Area (IBA) by BirdLife International because they support populations of red-tailed tropicbirds, Japanese wood pigeons and Matsudaira's storm petrels.

See also 
 Nanpō Islands
 Geography of Japan

References

External links

 
Bonin Islands
Volcano_Islands
Archipelagoes of Japan
Islands of Tokyo
Archipelagoes of the Pacific Ocean
1889 establishments
1891 establishments in Japan
Seabird colonies
Important Bird Areas of the Nanpo Islands